Beylikdüzü is a district in the European side of Istanbul, Turkey, located north of the Sea of Marmara, south of Esenyurt, east of Büyükçekmece, and west of Avcılar.

History 

It is assumed that Beylikdüzü was first settled by Greeks from Byzantion in the second century AD as a farming village.  It later became a popular resort for residents of Constantinople in the Byzantine Empire, a status that continued after the Fall of Constantinople to the Ottoman Empire. The region was referred to as "Garden" in the later Ottoman period, and following the foundation of the Turkish Republic was called "Kavaklı," after the large number of poplar trees, a name which was used until 2003. The modern name means "Plains of the Beylik."

Recent History

Beylikdüzü is populated especially after the 1999 İzmit earthquake by the people from older districts of Istanbul who preferred to move to newly constructed buildings in Beylikdüzü because of their fear for safety of the old buildings. When the Metrobus (rapid bus system) is extended from Avcılar to Beylikdüzü in 2012, Beylikdüzü is affected by the second wave of migration. With the advance of Metrobüs the perception of "distance" has changed and places which seemed far away before became closer, so many moved to Beylikdüzü. Its population has grown from around 3000 in the early 1990s to 350,000 by 2018. Since the population of Beylikdüzü consists mostly of migrants from other districts of Istanbul or Turkey, and Beylikdüzü is a relatively recently established city, Beylikdüzü has gained a welcoming atmosphere for the newcomers without having any social stratification. The popularity of Beylikdüzü has increased greatly in the last few years and the region became a hot spot for residential and commercial investments. Beylikdüzü has the highest rapid increase in the land and property value in Turkey, making its investors richer in a very short time. Beylikdüzü was one of the few municipalities in Turkey that switched from AKP to CHP in 2014 with an overwhelming (>10%) vote.

General 

Beylikdüzü is the modern part of Istanbul which is improving more every day. Beylikdüzu together with the Ataköy Marina district are now attracting the upper-middle class because of their good infrastructure, and are seeing the construction of new luxury developments. The attraction is also increased by their close proximity to the Istanbul Atatürk Airport. Beylikdüzü is ho

me to the most shopping malls in Istanbul and is considered a heaven for shopping, also referred to as the "AVM cumhuriyeti" (or republic of shopping in English).

Beylikdüzü is the one of the most cosmopolitan districts of Istanbul, thus hosting a mosaic of different cultures of Turkey together with people from other countries. Beylikdüzü matches the European cities with its high green space per person. The green space is over 10M² per person in Beylikdüzü. Almost in every street and avenue trees are planted at equal distance; making the whole neighborhood as an open-air museum. The construction of the botanical park in the huge valley between Adnan Kahveci and Cumhuriyet neighbourhood is still going on.

Istanbul Seafood Wholesale Market Hall in Kumkapı (in historical peninsula) is planned to be established in its new and bigger complex in Beylikdüzü. However, people with environmental awareness in Beylikdüzü have a concern that the new seafood market which is planned to be constructed by land reclamation on the Gürpinar coast of Beylikdüzü, can disturb the natural underwater current which cleans the Büyükçekmece Bay. Environmentalist people fear that having stopped the currents the bay can turn into a sewage zone and lost all its beauty. Plus some experts claim that the seafood supply is mostly carried from the land not from the sea so it will add an unnecessary traffic pressure on the Beylikdüzü's existing road system.

Neighbourhoods ("Mahalle" in Turkish)

 Adnan Kahveci
 Barış
 Büyükşehir
 Cumhuriyet
 Dereağzı
 Gürpınar
 Kavaklı
 Marmara
 Sahil
 Yakuplu

Climate
Beylikdüzü experiences a relatively cool Mediterranean climate (Csa/Cs) according to both Köppen and Trewartha climate classifications, with cool winters and warm to hot summers. As Beylikdüzü is approximately 150 meters above sea level, it is colder and windier than most other districts of Istanbul. It is in USDA hardiness zone 8b and AHS heat zone 4.

Gallery

References

 
Populated places in Istanbul Province
Districts of Istanbul Province